At least two ships of the French Navy have been named Orage:

 , a  launched in 1924 and sunk in 1940
 , an  launched in 1967 and sold for scrap in 2017

French Navy ship names